The 2020–21 FC DAC 1904 Dunajská Streda season was the club's 17th season in the Slovak Super Liga and 8th consecutive. DAC competed in the Fortuna Liga, UEFA Europa League and Slovak Cup. The season covered the period from 24 July 2020 to 15 May 2021.

For this season, the club has introduced a New Jersey to remind the 100th anniversary of the choice of the name DAC (Dunaszerdahelyi Atlétikai Club).

Players

Transfers and loans

Transfers in

Loans in

Transfers out

Loans out

Friendlies

Pre-season

Mid-season

Competition overview

Fortuna Liga

Regular stage

Results summary

League table

Results by round

Matches

Championship group

Table

Results summary

Results by round

Matches

UEFA Europa League

Slovak Cup

Statistics

Appearances and goals

|-
! colspan=14 style="background:#dcdcdc; text-align:center| Goalkeepers

|-
! colspan=14 style="background:#dcdcdc; text-align:center| Defenders

|-
! colspan=14 style="background:#dcdcdc; text-align:center| Midfielders 

|-
! colspan=14 style="background:#dcdcdc; text-align:center| Forwards

|}

Goalscorers

Clean sheets

Disciplinary record

Awards

Fortuna Liga: Player of the Year 
 Zsolt Kalmár

Fortuna Liga: Player of the Month

Fortuna Liga: Goal of the Month

Fortuna Liga: Top Eleven 
Source:
Defence: César Blackman
Midfield: Zsolt Kalmár
Attack: Eric Ramírez

Fortuna Liga: Top Eleven U21 
Source:
Defence:  César Blackman
Midfield:  András Schäfer,  Marko Divković
Attack:  Eric Ramírez

Notes

References

External links 
 Official website
 www.futbalnet.sk

FC DAC 1904 Dunajská Streda seasons
DAC Dunajská Streda
DAC Dunajská Streda